Lindstrom Field (full name Clyde & Glenn Lindstrom Field) is a sport stadium in Lindsborg, Kansas, United States.  The facility is primarily used by Bethany College for college football and men's and women's soccer teams.  The stadium is also used for local school (USD 400, Smoky Valley Public Schools) and other community events.

References

American football venues in Kansas
College football venues
Bethany Swedes football
Buildings and structures in McPherson County, Kansas